Saint Luke's East Hospital is a 238-bed hospital located in Lee's Summit, Missouri.

History

Saint Luke's East first opened in 2006. In 2007, then President of the United States George W. Bush toured the hospital and participated in a roundtable discussion about health care initiatives and affordability.

The hospital underwent a $68 million expansion in 2011, added a new oncology wing in 2013, and added 30 additional beds in 2015.   In 2018 Saint Luke's East completed a $10 million, 25,000-square-foot surgical department expansion which included two new operating suites, triage and post-anesthesia care unit (PACU) rooms, along with additional work and storage space.

References

Hospital buildings completed in 2006
Buildings and structures in Lee's Summit, Missouri
Hospitals in Missouri
2006 establishments in Missouri